Clavariadelphus ligula, commonly known as the strap coral, is a species of fungi in the family Gomphaceae. It produces club-shaped fruit bodies with spongy flesh that grow in groups on the forest floor. It is found in Asia, Europe, and North America.

Taxonomy

The species was first described by the German naturalist Jacob Christian Schaeffer in 1774 as Clavaria ligula. It was first placed in Clavariadelphus by Marinus Anton Donk in 1933. Clavaria ophioglossoides, described by August Batsch in 1783, is considered a synonym.

The fungus is commonly known as the "strap coral". The specific epithet ligula is derived from the Latin word for "shoestring".

Description

The club portion of the fruit body is pale yellow, whitish sharp, straight, and stiff hairs at its base. The surface is dull, and does not have hairs. It is smooth at first then later becomes somewhat wrinkled. The stipe is not distinct except for the hairs at the base. The flesh is whitish, and does not change color with bruising. It is somewhat spongy in the upper part, but firm below. The flesh has no odor, and its taste is slightly bitter. The surface tissue turns green upon the application of a solution of ferric sulphate, and yellow with a dilute solution of potassium hydroxide.

The spores are pale yellowish orange ("light buff") in print. Additional features may be discerned using light microscopy: they are smooth, narrowly ellipsoid, and measure 8–15 by 3–6 μm. The hyphae are monomitic, and clamp connections are present. Cystidia are absent.

One field guide lists the species as edible, while another says it is inedible.

Similar species
Clavariadelphus sachalinensis is macroscopically identical from C. ligula, and can be distinguished only by its larger spores, measuring 16–24 by 4–6 μm, and longer basidia. However, intermediate forms are often found, and they may represent the same species. Clavaria flavipes is another similar species, but in addition to being smaller and more pale yellow than Clavariadelphus ligula, it also has broader spores.

Habitat and distribution
The fruit bodies of Clavariadelphus ligula grow gregariously (closely scattered over small areas) on the ground, in forest duff. They are widespread and common in coniferous forests, fruiting in the summer and fall.

The species has been collected in the Czech Republic, in the Magadan region of the Russian Far East as well as the arctic zone of the Urals. It has also been collected in the conifer-dominated forests in Kashmir Valley in India. In North America, the distribution extends north to Canada.

References

External links

Phallales
Fungi described in 1774
Fungi of Asia
Fungi of North America
Taxa named by Jacob Christian Schäffer